Amor y Alegria (English: Love and Joy) is the second studio album recorded by Nicaraguan salsa singer-songwriter Luis Enrique. The album was released by CBS Discos in 1988 (see 1988 in music). The album earned him international recognition as the album was produced during the salsa romantica era of the 1980s. Some of the songs are cuts from the previous album, Amor de Medianoche (1987).

Singles
The album produced six singles that charted on the Hot Latin Tracks.

Comprendelo (Understand) was the first single released from the album in 1988. The song reached No. 8 on the Hot Latin Tracks, the highest peaking single from the album.
Desesperado (Hopeless) was the second single released from the album. The single is a cover of Emmanuel's song in 1988. This version peaked No. 10 on Hot Latin Tracks.
Tu No Le Amas, Le Temes (You Don't Love Him, You Are Afraid of Him) was the third single released from the album and is considered one of his signature songs. The song peaked No. 12 on Hot Latin Tracks.
Volverte a Ver (Seeing you again) The single is a cover of Dyango's song in 1983. Was the fourth single released from the album and charted No. 28 on the Hot Latin Tracks.
Tu Cuerpo (Your Body) The single is a cover of Roberto Carlos's song in 1976. Was the fifth single released from the album and charted No. 28 on Hot Latin Tracks.
Que Sera de Ti (What Will Become of You?) was the sixth released from the album and charted No. 27 on the Hot Latin Tracks.

Track listing
"Desesperado" (Glenn Monroig, K.C. Porter, Mark Spiro) – 3:50
"Tú No le Amas, le Temes" (Jorge Luís Piloto) – 4:27
"Compréndelo" (Luis Enrique Mejía) – 5:20
"Amor y Alegría" (Jorge Luis Piloto) – 4:46
"Tu Cuerpo" (Erasmo Carlos, Roberto Carlos, Buddy McCluskey) – 4:21
"Volverte a Ver" (Ray Girado, Amado Jaen) – 5:03
"Que Será de Ti" (Luis Enrique Mejía) – 4:38
"Tal Vez Un Día Amor" (Luis Enrique Mejía) – 4:40

Credits and personnel
Músicos
 
Sesión de Puerto Rico:
Luis Enrique – Voz, Conga, & Bongo
Tommy Villarini – Trompeta, solo en "Desesperado"
Angie Machado – Trompeta
Rafy Torres – Trombón 
Carlos "Cuto" Soto – Trombón, Coros
Eric Figueroa – Piano, Teclados
Pedrito Perez – Bajo
Chago Martinez – Timbal
Tony Jiménez – Percusíones
Jerry Medina – Coros
Pichy Pérez – Coros
Arreglos: Carlos "Cuto" Soto & Luis Enrique
Ingeniero de Grabación: Hilton Colón
Asistentes: Johnny Lebron & Diana Ortiz
Grabado en: OCHOA RECORDING STUDIOS, P.R., Abril 1988

Sesión de Miami:
Luis Enrique – Voz, Percussion
Robbie Driggs – Drum Programming
Steve Rothstein – Keyboards Programming
Manny López – Guitarra
Rafael "California" Valencia – Bajo
Tony Concepción – Trumpet & Flugel
Dana Teboe – Trombone
Arreglo: Camilo Valencia 
Ingeniero- Edward González
Grabado en: QUADRADIAL RECORDING STUDIOS
Producción: Camilo Valencia & Luis Enrique
Productor Ejecutivo: Ángel Carrasco
Fotos: Donna Victor
Ropa: Miami Dice
Arte y Diseño Carátula: DRAGO
Maquillaje y Peinado: Frank Tolosa

Chart position

Critical reception

José A. Estévez, Jr of Allmusic gave the album a positive review calling it "romantic salsa at its best". Amor y Alegría was nominated for a Lo Nuestro Award for Tropical Album of the Year in 1989.

See also
List of number-one Billboard Tropical Albums from the 1980s

References

1988 albums
Luis Enrique (singer) albums
CBS Discos albums
Spanish-language albums